Rolling Stone Original may refer to:

 Rolling Stone Original (Papa Roach EP), 2004
 Rolling Stone Original (Big & Rich EP), 2005
 Rolling Stone Original (Goo Goo Dolls EP), 2006